Evelyn Conlon (born 1952) is an Irish novelist, short story writer, and essayist. Over the course of her career, Conlon has published dozens of novels, short stories, and essays. Her 2003 novel, Skin of Dreams, was shortlisted for Irish Novel of the Year.

Conlon is a member of Aosdána and has been appointed a writer-in-residence at educational institutions around the world, including the University College Dublin, the University of Minnesota, and Mishkanot Sha’anamin, Jerusalem. She is an adjunct professor in the creative writing MFA program at Carlow University, Pittsburgh, Pennsylvania.

A member of Irishwomen United, Conlon was a founding member of the Dublin Rape Crisis Centre in 1979.

Biography
Conlon was born in Rockcorry, County Monaghan, where she spent her childhood. She was educated at St. Patrick's College in Maynooth and briefly attended University College Dublin.

At the age of 19, Conlon went to Australia by ship in 1972 and worked at various jobs around the country.  When she returned to Ireland by bus overland in 1975, she gave birth to her first child, returned to education at Maynooth College, where she also started a child care center (creche). While earning her degree, she gave birth to her second child and separated from her husband.

Conlon resides in Dublin with her partner Fintan Valley, a musician, author, and ethnomusicologist.

Writing 
Conlon said that she developed a passion to "be a novelist before [she] knew what a novel was."

She received her first accolade for writing when she won the European Schools Day essay competition at the age of 17 and published her first piece of writing the same year in New Irish Writing at The Irish Press.

Some of Conlon’s fictional work explores sociopolitical issues such as capital punishment, feminism, and the plight of refugees. In observing the overlap between her writing and political advocacy, Conlon has noted, "I don’t think you can be a ‘feminist’ writer, I think you’re a writer. I am a writer who is a feminist. And, my feminist consciousness affects the sort of things I enjoy writing about."

Conlon has also been described as  a "politically engaged writer [who] casts a sometimes acerbic eye on the female experience in the Ireland of the late twentieth and early twenty-first century."

Selected works

Novels
 Stars in the Daytime (1989)
 A Glassful of Letters (1998)
 Skin of Dreams (2003)
 Not the Same Sky (2013)

Short story collections
 My Head is Opening (1987)
 Taking Scarlet as a Real Colour (1993)
 An Cloigeann is a Luach - What Worth the Head : County Limerick Anthology  (1998)
 Telling (2000)
 Cutting the Night in Two – with Hans-Christian Oeser (2001)
 Later On: The Monaghan Bombing Memorial Anthology  (2004)

References 

20th-century Irish women writers
21st-century Irish women writers
1952 births
20th-century Irish short story writers
21st-century Irish short story writers
Living people
Alumni of University College Dublin
People from County Monaghan
Irish women short story writers